Olivia Rogowska was the defending champion, but decided to participate in Granby instead.

Anhelina Kalinina won the title, defeating An-Sophie Mestach in the final, 4–6, 6–4, 6–3.

Seeds

Main draw

Finals

Top half

Bottom half

References 
 Main draw

FSP Gold River Women's Challenger - Singles
FSP Gold River Women's Challenger